Robert D. Crutchfield is an American sociologist and professor emeritus of sociology at the University of Washington. He is known for his book Get A Job: Labor Markets, Economic Opportunity, and Crime, which was published in 2014.

Education
Crutchfield received his B.A. from Thiel College and his M.A. and Ph.D. from Vanderbilt University.

Career
Crutchfield is the former vice president of the American Society of Criminology, the former chair of the American Sociological Association's Crime, Law, and Deviance Section, and a former member of the American Sociological Association's committee. He was also a member of the National Research Council's Committee on Law and Justice from 2005 to 2011.

Honors and awards
Crutchfield is a fellow of the American Society of Criminology, and has received the University of Washington’s Distinguished Teaching Award.

References

External links
Crutchfield's faculty page
Crutchfield's page at Crime & Justice Research Alliance

University of Washington faculty
Living people
Thiel College alumni
Vanderbilt University alumni
American criminologists
Year of birth missing (living people)